XHPAB-FM is a Mexican radio station that serves the region around La Paz, Baja California Sur.

It formerly broadcast on 1080 kHz as XEPAB-AM.

External links
 Radio Locator information on XEPAB

References

Radio stations in La Paz, Baja California Sur